Atom Bomb Blues is a BBC Books original novel written by Andrew Cartmel and based on the long-running British science fiction television series Doctor Who. Published in late 2005, it features the Seventh Doctor and Ace. It is the last published Past Doctor Adventure to be issued by BBC Books, the company having decided in 2005 to focus on a new series of books tying into the television series and featuring the "current" Doctors.

Synopsis
The Doctor and Ace travel to a parallel universe, where they become involved in a conspiracy involving that Earth's Manhattan Project, Duke Ellington, and Japanese saboteurs.

2005 British novels
2005 science fiction novels
Past Doctor Adventures
Seventh Doctor novels
Novels by Andrew Cartmel